is a retired Japanese discus and hammer thrower.

Murofushi comes from a hammer throwing family, as her father Shigenobu Murofushi is a former Olympian and held the Japanese record for decades, and her brother Koji Murofushi, is the 2004 Olympic champion in the event. Her mother, Serafina Moritz, is Romanian, and former European junior javelin champion and senior champion for Romania. Her parents are now divorced.

She won the 2010 Japanese title in both the discus and hammer throw events.

International competitions

Personal bests
Hammer throw – 67.77 m (2004 in Fujiyoshida) – national record.
Discus throw – 58.62 m (2007 in Gifu) – national record.

References

1977 births
Living people
People from Numazu, Shizuoka
Sportspeople from Shizuoka Prefecture
Japanese female discus throwers
Japanese female hammer throwers
Olympic female hammer throwers
Olympic athletes of Japan
Athletes (track and field) at the 2004 Summer Olympics
Asian Games bronze medalists for Japan
Asian Games medalists in athletics (track and field)
Athletes (track and field) at the 2002 Asian Games
Athletes (track and field) at the 2006 Asian Games
Athletes (track and field) at the 2010 Asian Games
Medalists at the 2010 Asian Games
World Athletics Championships athletes for Japan
Japan Championships in Athletics winners
Japanese people of Romanian descent
20th-century Japanese women